Muhammad Qasim (1974–2006) was a field hockey player from Pakistan who had played in the Olympics. Qasim started his career in the 1998 world cup, represented Pakistan in the 2000 Sydney Olympic as well as two Commonwealth games - as well as other events. Qasim who earned 81 caps for Pakistan, made his last international appearance at the 2004 Azlan Shah Cup.

Death
Qasim was diagnosed with abdominal cancer whilst receiving treatment after suffering injuries during training. Initially he received treatment at the Shaukat Khanum Memorial Hospital in Lahore but was transferred to the United States for further treatment - however he was unable to recover. Qasim died at the age of 32 and buried in his hometown of Gojra on 26 October 2006.

References

External links

People from Toba Tek Singh District
Deaths from cancer in Pakistan
Pakistani male field hockey players
Olympic field hockey players of Pakistan
Male field hockey goalkeepers
Punjabi people
1974 births
2006 deaths
Field hockey players at the 2000 Summer Olympics
1998 Men's Hockey World Cup players
2002 Men's Hockey World Cup players
Asian Games medalists in field hockey
Field hockey players at the 1998 Asian Games
Field hockey players at the 2002 Asian Games
Commonwealth Games medallists in field hockey
Commonwealth Games bronze medallists for Pakistan
Asian Games bronze medalists for Pakistan
Medalists at the 1998 Asian Games
Field hockey players at the 2002 Commonwealth Games
Medallists at the 2002 Commonwealth Games